"That's When I Think of You" is the debut single of Australian pop rock band 1927. The song was released on 4 July 1988 and peaked at number six on the Australian ARIA Singles Chart. In May 1989, the song reached number 46 on the UK Singles Chart. The single also charted at number 100 on the US Billboard Hot 100 and number 55 on the Canadian RPM Top Singles chart in August 1989.

The track won the award for Breakthrough Artist at the ARIA Music Awards of 1989 and was nominated for Single of the Year and Producer of the Year, losing to "Under the Milky Way" by the Church and "Age of Reason" by John Farnham, respectively.

Background
1927 formed in Melbourne in 1987 as a pop rock band with James Barton on drums, Bill Frost on bass guitar, his brother Garry Frost (ex-Moving Pictures) on guitar and keyboards, and Eric Weideman on lead vocals and guitar. After a year of vainly seeking a recording contract, 1927 were signed mid-1988 by WEA.

Track listings

Charts

Weekly chart

Year-end chart

Release history

References

1927 (band) songs
1988 debut singles
1988 songs
ARIA Award-winning songs
Warner Music Group singles